The 2001 Paris Municipal Elections were held on the 11th and 18th of March 2001, alongside many other municipal elections throughout France, to elect the Mayor of Paris. Incumbent Mayor Jean Tiberi faced Bertrand Delanoë of the Socialist Party, a Paris councilor and member of the Senate. Tiberi also faced a challenger from the right in Philippe Séguin, the former president of France's National Assembly due to Tiberi having split off from the RPR to form his own dissident faction within the Council of Paris. Tiberi also faced green city councilor Yves Contassot. Due to the division within the RPR, the center-right vote was split which allowed Delanoë's Socialists to come to power for the first time since an independent Paris Mayorship has been re-established in 1977. 

Control for the Mayorships of Paris's 20 arrondissements was also in play. The Socialist Party won 11 arrondissement mayorships, the two RPR factions together 8, and The Greens 1.

Candidates
Jean Tiberi (RPR), incumbent Mayor and member of the National Assembly.
 Bertrand Delanoë (PS), Paris Councilor, member of the Senate and former member of the National Assembly.
 Philippe Séguin (RPR), member and former president of the National Assembly.
 Yves Contassot (LV), Paris Councilor.

General results

Elected mayors

See also 
2001 French municipal elections

References

Municipal election
Paris Municipal election
Elections in Paris